Governor Benson may refer to:

Arthur Benson (1907–1987), Governor of Northern Rhodesia from 1954 to 1959
Craig Benson (born 1954), 79th Governor of New Hampshire
Elmer Austin Benson (1895–1985), 24th Governor of Minnesota
Frank W. Benson (politician) (1858–1911), 12th Governor of Oregon